The Ghoubet Wind Power Station is a 60 megawatts wind power energy project, under construction in the country of Djibouti located in Africa. The wind farm is under development by independent power producers. The power generated will be sold to Electricité de Djibouti (EDD) (Electricity of Djibouti), the national electricity utility monopoly, for integration into the national grid. The wind farm is the country's first grid-ready renewable energy power station. The Republic of Djibouti has plans to derive all its electricity from renewable sources by 2030.

Location
The wind farm is located in the Arta Region, near the border with the Tadjourah Region, close to Lake Ghoubet, in Djibouti.

Overview
As of April 2020, Djibouti had installed capacity of 126 megawatts for its population of 940,000, together with their businesses, homes, offices and industries. Most of the installed electricity sources, at that time were expensive fossil-fuel-based.

Ghoubet Wind Farm represents the first of a number of renewable energy sources, as the country diversifies into clean, renewable sources of energy. The project's plan initially comprised 15 wind turbines, each with a maximum rating of 4.8 megawatts, for total capacity of 60 MW. Later, the design was changed to 17 wind turbines, each with rating of 3.465 megawatts, for a total capacity of 58.9 MW.

Ownership
This power station is owned by a consortium whose members are illustrated in the table below. The members of the consortium formed a special purpose vehicle company called Red Sea Power Limited SAS which is constructing and will operate as well as manage the power station.

Construction and timeline
The engineering, procurement and construction (EPC) contract was awarded to a consortium comprising the Spanish group Siemens Gamesa Renewable Energy, the world's second largest wind turbine manufacturer and Grupo Auxiliar Metalúrgico S.A., another Spanish company. Construction began in March 2021 and commercial commissioning in expected in the first half of 2022.

See also

 List of power stations in Djibouti

References

External links
 Approximate Location of Ghoubet Wind Power Station

Arta Region
Power stations in Djibouti
Wind farms in Djibouti
Energy infrastructure in Africa